Open Range is a 2003 American Revisionist Western film directed and co-produced by Kevin Costner, written by Craig Storper, based on the novel "The Open Range Men" by Lauran Paine, starring Robert Duvall and Costner, with Annette Bening, Michael Gambon, and Michael Jeter appearing in supporting roles. The film was the final on-screen appearance of Jeter, who died before it was released, and the film was dedicated to Jeter's memory, as well as to Costner's parents, Bill and Sharon.

The film was a box office success and was critically favored.

Plot
In Montana in 1882, "Boss" Spearman is a seasoned open range cattleman, who, with hired hands Charley Waite, Mose, and Button, is driving a herd cross-country. Charley is a former Union soldier who served in a "special squad" during the Civil War and feels immense guilt over his past as a killer of both enemy soldiers and civilians.

Boss sends Mose to the nearby town of Harmonville for supplies. The town is controlled by ruthless Irish immigrant and rancher Denton Baxter, who hates open-rangers for using his land to feed their herds. Mose is badly beaten and jailed by the town's corrupt marshal, Poole, after defending himself in a fight with some of Baxter's men. The only Harmonville inhabitant willing to openly defy Baxter is Percy, the livery stable owner.

Boss and Charley become concerned when Mose does not return. They retrieve him from the jail but not before Baxter gives them an ultimatum to leave the area before nightfall. Mose's injuries are so severe that Boss and Charley take him to the local physician, Doc Barlow. There they meet his assistant, Sue. Charley is attracted immediately but assumes that Sue is the doctor's wife and chooses not to stay the night even after being invited.

After catching masked riders scouting their cattle, Boss and Charley sneak up on their campsite, disarm, and humiliate them. At the same time, other riders trash their camp and shoot Mose and Charley's dog Tig dead. Button is badly injured after being shot in the chest. Charley and Boss vow to avenge their friend. They leave Button at the doctor's house and go into town; with help from Percy, they capture Poole and his deputies, subdue them with chloroform stolen from the Barlows, and lock them up in their own jail.

Charley learns that Sue is the doctor's sister, not his wife. He declares his feelings for her, and she gives him a locket for luck. Charley leaves a note with Percy, in which he states that if he should die, money from the sale of his saddle and gear are to be used to buy Sue a new tea set, having accidentally destroyed her previous set while suffering a flashback to his war days.

Boss and Charley are pitted against Baxter and his men. Before the fight begins, Charley confesses to Boss that his full name is Charles Postlewaite, and he asks Boss to reciprocate. Boss says his real name is Bluebonnet Spearman, but makes Charley swear not to tell anyone. As Baxter and his men approach, Charley confronts them and shoots Butler, the hired gunman who killed Mose. An intense gun battle erupts in the street, with Boss, Charley and Percy outnumbered before the townspeople begin to openly fight against Baxter. Baxter's men, Poole and his deputies, and the local saloonkeeper are killed off one-by-one and Baxter ends up wounded and alone, trapped in the jailhouse. Boss shoots open the jailhouse door and engages him in a brief close-quarters gunfight which leaves Baxter mortally wounded.

Sue's brother tends to the wounded townspeople while the dead are buried, and the town is cleaned up. Charley speaks to Sue in private, telling her he must leave. She counters that she has a "big idea" about their future together and that she will wait for him to return. He does return, and proposes to Sue, who accepts. After Button has recovered, Charley and Boss decide to retire from the cattle business after delivering their current herd and settle down in Harmonville, taking over the saloon.

Cast

 Robert Duvall as Boss Spearman / Bluebonnet Spearman
 Kevin Costner as Charley Waite / Charles Travis Postelwaite
 Annette Bening as Sue Barlow
 Michael Gambon as Denton Baxter
 Michael Jeter as Percy
 Diego Luna as Button
 James Russo as Marshal Poole
 Abraham Benrubi as Mose Harrison
 Dean McDermott as Doc Barlow
 Kim Coates as Butler
 Herbert Kohler Jr. as Cafe Man
 Peter MacNeill as Mack
 Cliff Saunders as Ralph
 Patricia Stutz as Ralph's Wife
 Julian Richings as Wylie
 Ian Tracey as Tom
 Rod Wilson as Gus

Production

Inspiration
Kevin Costner grew up reading the western romance novels of Lauran Paine and Open Range is based on Paine's 1990 novel The Open Range Men. Screenwriter Craig Storper wanted to make a movie about "the evolution of violence in the West." Storper continues: "These characters don't seek violence... But the notion that it's sometimes necessary... is the Western's most fundamental ideal."

Casting
Robert Duvall was the only actor that Costner had in mind for the role of Boss Spearman. Costner said that if Duvall had turned down the part, he might not have made the movie at all. Duvall accepted the role immediately, and Costner gave him top billing. Duvall got bucked off a horse and broke six ribs while practicing his riding for this role.

On the audio commentary for the DVD of the movie, Costner remarked that he cast Abraham Benrubi as his way of apologizing for his being cut from Costner's previous movie, The Postman.

Filming
Cinematographer J. Michael Muro, was hand-picked by director Kevin Costner for his work on Dances with Wolves.

The movie was filmed on location on the Stoney Indian Reserve in Alberta, Canada. Clayton Lefthand of the Stoney Sioux First Nations worked as a film liaison.

Filming took place from June 17, 2002 to September 8, 2002. Production spent over one million dollars to build a town from scratch because Costner didn't like any of the existing ones. This location was so far from civilization that they had to spend $40,000 to build a road to get there. Professional cowboys handled 225 head of cattle on the set.

Reception

Box office
Open Range was a success at the box office, making $14 million in its opening weekend in the U.S across 2,075 screens. Against a budget of $22 million it finished its theatrical run with $58.3 million in North America and $10 million from foreign markets for a total of $68.3 million worldwide.

Critical reception
The film received mostly positive reviews, receiving a 79% rating on Rotten Tomatoes based on 184 reviews, with an average rating of 6.80/10. The site's consensus states: "Greatly benefiting from the tremendous chemistry between Kevin Costner and Robert Duvall, Open Range is a sturdy modern Western with classic roots." 

Roger Ebert gave it three and a half out of four stars, calling it "an imperfect but deeply involving and beautifully made Western". Peter Bradshaw of The Guardian gave the film four out of five stars, writing, "Duvall gives his best performance in ages" in a "tough, muscular, satisfying movie".

In particular, the gun fighting scenes were intentionally filmed in giant wide shots and were praised for their intense realism by a number of critics and yet were the reason the film earned an R rating. Kevin Carr of FilmThreat.com said on the gun action in Open Range: "After The Matrix redefined action in the late 1990s, every crummy action sequence tries to repeat the power of 'bullet time' often with little success. The action in Open Range is filmed real time, grabbing the audience and showing them that when this kind of stuff happens in real life, it happens faster than you think it would." A review on Moviola stated that the film has "one of the most exciting final gunfights ever filmed". IGN, USA Today, Total Film and Guns & Ammo all also say the shootout scene is one of the best of all time.

Awards
The film won the 2004 Western Heritage Award, and was nominated for a Golden Satellite Award, an MTV Movie Award (Diego Luna), a Motion Picture Sound Editors Award as well as a Taurus Award for stunt artist Chad Camilleri. It was #48 in TimeOut London's "The 50 greatest westerns" list.

References

External links
 
 
 

2003 films
Beacon Pictures films
Touchstone Pictures films
Films based on American novels
Films based on Western (genre) novels
2003 Western (genre) films
2000s English-language films
Films directed by Kevin Costner
Films shot in Alberta
Films set in Montana
American Western (genre) films
Films set in the 1880s
Films scored by Michael Kamen
Films set in 1882
Films produced by David Valdes
2000s American films